The 11th Costume Designers Guild Awards, honouring the best costume designs in film and television for 2008, were given on February 17, 2009. The nominees were announced on January 13, 2009.

Nominees

Film
 Contemporary Film:
 Winner - Suttirat Larlarb – Slumdog Millionaire 
 Rebecca Bentjen and Laura Jean Shannon – Iron Man
 Ann Roth – Mamma Mia!
 Patricia Field – Sex and the City
 Amy Westcott – The Wrestler

 Fantasy Film:
 Winner - Lindy Hemming – The Dark Knight 
 Isis Mussenden – The Chronicles of Narnia: Prince Caspian
 Sanja Milkovic Hays – The Mummy: Tomb of the Dragon Emperor

 Period Film:
 Winner - Michael O'Connor – The Duchess 
 Deborah Hopper – Changeling
 Jacqueline West – The Curious Case of Benjamin Button
 Danny Glicker – Milk
 Albert Wolsky – Revolutionary Road

Television
 Contemporary Series:

 Ugly Betty – Eduardo Castro & Patricia Field
 30 Rock – Tom Broecker
 Dancing with the Stars – Randall Christensen
 Entourage – Amy Westcott
 Gossip Girl – Eric Daman

 Fantasy or Period Series:

 Mad Men – Janie Bryant
 Pushing Daisies – Robert Blackman	
 ''The Tudors – Joan Bergin

 Miniseries or Television Film:

2008 film awards
2008 guild awards
2008 in fashion
Costume Designers Guild Awards
2008 television awards
2009 in American cinema
2009 in American television